PARAM is a series of supercomputers designed and assembled by the Centre for Development of Advanced Computing (C-DAC) in Pune, India. PARAM means "supreme" in the Sanskrit language, whilst also creating an acronym for "PARAllel Machine". As of November 2022 the fastest machine in the series is the PARAM Siddhi AI which ranks 120th in world, with an Rpeak of 5.267 petaflops.

History

C-DAC was created in November 1987, originally as the Centre for Development of Advanced Computing Technology (C-DACT). This was in response to issues purchasing supercomputers from foreign sources. The Indian Government decided to try and develop indigenous computing technology. More information about "Param: The First Super Computer of India" had been elaborated by Avishek Bhattacharjee in a research paper.

PARAM 8000
The PARAM 8000 was the first machine in the series and was built from scratch. A prototype was benchmarked at the "1990 Zurich Super-computing Show": of the machines that ran at the show it came second only to one from the United States.

A 64-node machine was delivered in August 1991. Each node used Inmos T800/T805 transputers. A 256-node machine had a theoretical performance of 1GFLOPS, however in practice had a sustained performance of 100-200MFLOPS. PARAM 8000 was a distributed memory MIMD architecture with a reconfigurable interconnection network.

The PARAM 8000 was noted to be 28 times more powerful than the Cray X-MP that the government originally requested, for the same $10 million cost quoted for it.

Exports
The computer was a success and was exported to Germany, United Kingdom and Russia. Apart from taking over the home market, PARAM attracted 14 other buyers with its relatively low price tag of $350,000.

The computer was also exported to the ICAD Moscow in 1991 under Russian collaboration.

PARAM 8600
PARAM 8600 was an improvement over PARAM 8000. In 1992 C-DAC realised its machines were underpowered and wished to integrate the newly released Intel i860 processor. Each node was created with one i860 and four Inmos T800 transputers. The same PARAS programming environment was used for both the PARAM 8000 and 8600; this meant that programs were portable. Each 8600 cluster was noted to be as powerful as 4 PARAM 8000 clusters.

PARAM 9000
The PARAM 9000 was designed to be merge cluster processing and massively parallel processing computing workloads. It was first demonstrated in 1994. The design was changed to be modular so that newer processors could be easily accommodated. Typically a system used 32–40 processors, however it could be scaled up to 200 CPUs using the clos network topology. The PARAM 9000/SS was the SuperSPARC II processor variant, the PARAM 9000/US used the UltraSPARC processor, and the PARAM 9000/AA used the DEC Alpha.

PARAM 10000
The PARAM 10000 was unveiled in 1998 as part of C-DAC's second mission. PARAM 10000 used several independent nodes, each based on the Sun Enterprise 250 server; each such server contained two 400Mhz UltraSPARC II processors. The base configuration had three compute nodes and a server node. The peak speed of this base system was 6.4 GFLOPS. A typical system would contain 160 CPUs and be capable of 100 GFLOPS But, it was easily scalable to the TFLOP range. Exported to Russia and Singapore.

Further computers
Further computers were made in the PARAM series as one-off supercomputers, rather than serial production machines. From the late 2010s many machines were created as part of the National Supercomputing Mission.

Supercomputer summary

PARAMNet
PARAMNet is a high speed high bandwidth low latency network developed for the PARAM series. The original PARAMNet used an 8 port cascadable non-blocking switch developed by C-DAC. Each port provided 400 Mb/s in both directions (thus 2x400 Mbit/s) as it was a full-duplex network. It was first used in PARAM 10000.

PARAMNet II, introduced with PARAM Padma, is capable of 2.5 Gbit/s while working full-duplex. It supports interfaces like Virtual Interface Architecture and Active messages. It uses 8 or 16 port SAN switches.

PARAMNet-3, used in PARAM Yuva and PARAM Yuva-II, is next generation high performance networking component for building supercomputing systems. PARAMNet-3 consists of tightly integrated hardware and software components. The hardware components consist of Network Interface Cards (NIC) based on CDAC's fourth generation communication co-processor "GEMINI", and modular 48-port Packet Routing Switch "ANVAY". The software component "KSHIPRA" is a lightweight protocol stack designed to exploit capabilities of hardware and to provide industry standard interfaces to the applications. Other application areas identified for deployment of PARAMNet-3 are storage and database applications.

Operators
PARAM supercomputers are used by both public and private operators for various purposes. As of 2008, 52 PARAMs have been deployed. Of these, 8 are located in Russia, Singapore, Germany and Canada.
PARAMs have also been sold to Tanzania, Armenia, Saudi Arabia, Singapore, Ghana, Myanmar, Nepal, Kazakhstan, Uzbekistan, and Vietnam.

See also
 EKA
 SAGA-220, a 220 TeraFLOP supercomputer built by ISRO
 Supercomputing in India
 Wipro Supernova

Notes

References

External links
PARAM Padma information page from C-DAC website

National Supercomputing Mission, INDIA

Supercomputers
Information technology in India
Supercomputing in India